Diplostephium antisanense is a species of flowering plant in the family Asteraceae. It is found only in Ecuador. Its natural habitats are subtropical or tropical moist montane forests, subtropical or tropical high-altitude shrubland, and subtropical or tropical high-altitude grassland. It is threatened by habitat loss.

References

antisansense
Flora of Ecuador
Least concern plants
Taxonomy articles created by Polbot